An association football tournament was played as part of the 1988 Summer Olympics. The tournament featured 16 men's national teams from six continental confederations. The teams were drawn into four groups of four with each group playing a round-robin tournament. At the end of the group stage, the top two teams advanced to the knockout stage, beginning with the quarter-finals and culminating with the gold medal match at the Seoul Olympic Stadium on 1 October 1988.

Before the final match, the Soviet team relocated from the Olympic Village to a Soviet steamship stationed nearby. After winning the gold medal, each player from the Soviet team received 15 thousand dollars from the Soviet government.

Venues

Medal summary

Note: The players above the line played at least one game in this tournament, the players below the line were only squad members. Nevertheless, the International Olympic Committee medal database credits them all as medalists.

Qualification
The following 16 teams qualified for the 1988 Olympics football tournament:

Participating nations

Each country was allowed to enter a team of 20 players and they all were eligible for participation. A total number of 314 footballers were entered.

A total of 268(*) footballers from 16 nations competed at the Seoul Games:

 
 
 
 
 
 
 
 
 
 
 
 
 
 
 
 

(*) NOTE: Players who participated in at least one match.

Final tournament

First round

Group A

Group B

Group C

Group D

Knockout stage

Quarter-finals

Semi-finals

Bronze medal match

Gold medal match

Final ranking

Venues
 Olympic Stadium – Seoul
 Dongdaemun Stadium – Seoul
 Busan Gudeok Stadium – Busan
 Daegu Civic Stadium – Daegu
 Daejeon Hanbat Stadium – Daejeon
 Gwangju Mudeung Stadium – Gwangju

Match officials

Africa
  Jean-Fidele Diramba
  Baba Laouissi
  Badara Sène

Asia
  Jamal Al Sharif
  Choi Gil-Soo
  Mandi Jassim
  Shizuo Takada

South America
  Juan Daniel Cardellino
  Arnaldo Cézar Coelho
  Jesús Díaz
  Juan Carlos Loustau
  Hernán Silva

North and Central America
  Edgardo Codesal
  Lennox Sirjuesingh
  Vincent Mauro

Europe
  Gérard Biguet
  Keith Hackett
  Kenny Hope
  Kurt Röthlisberger
  Tullio Lanese
  Michał Listkiewicz
  Karl-Heinz Tritschler
  Alexey Spirin

Oceania
  Chris Bambridge

Goalscorers
With seven goals, Romário of Brazil was the top scorer in the tournament. In total, 95 goals were scored by 53 different players, with only one of them credited as own goal.

7 goals
 Romário
6 goals
 Igor Dobrovolski
 Kalusha Bwalya
5 goals
 Oleksiy Mykhaylychenko
4 goals
 Jürgen Klinsmann
3 goals

 Carlos Alfaro
 Pietro Paolo Virdis
 Jan Hellström
 Frank Mill

2 goals

 Bebeto
 Ahmed Radhi
 Andrea Carnevale
 Arminas Narbekovas
 Peter Lönn
 Nabil Maaloul
 Holger Fach
 Wolfram Wuttke
 Dragan Stojković
 Refik Šabanadžović
 Derby Makinka

1 goal

 Néstor Fabbri
 Frank Farina
 John Kosmina
 André Cruz
 Edmar
 Geovani Silva
 Adán Paniagua
 Carlos Castañeda
 Karim Allawi
 Mudhafar Jabbar
 Alberigo Evani
 Ciro Ferrara
 Massimo Crippa
 Massimo Mauro
 Ruggiero Rizzitelli
 Stefano Desideri
 Noh Soo-Jin
 Rashidi Yekini
 Yury Savichev
 Jonas Thern
 Leif Engqvist
 Tarak Dhiab
 Brent Goulet
 John Doyle
 Mike Windischmann
 Christian Schreier
 Fritz Walter
 Gerhard Kleppinger
 Roland Grahammer
 Wolfgang Funkel
 Jonson Bwalya
 Stone Nyirenda

Own goal
 Rocael Mazariegos (playing against Iraq)

References

External links

Olympic Football Tournament Seoul 1988, FIFA.com
RSSSF Summary
FIFA Technical Report (Part 1), (Part 2), (Part 3) and (Part 4)

 
1988 Summer Olympics events
1988
Olympics
1988
1988 in South Korean football